Nagamangalam is a village in the Ariyalur taluk of Ariyalur district, Tamil Nadu, India.

Demographics 

As per the 2001 census, Nagamangalam had a total population of 2904 with 1501 males and 1403 females.

References 

Villages in Ariyalur district